Jingdong may refer to:

Jingdong Yi Autonomous County, an autonomous county in Yunnan, China
Jingdong, Jiangxi, a town in Nanchang, Jiangxi, China
Jingdong Subdistrict, Deyang, Sichuan, China
JD.com, also known as Jingdong Mall, a Chinese online commerce company
Jingdong Circuit, a circuit or province during the Song dynasty
The Chinese name for Kengtung, Myanmar

Toad species
Jingdong horned toad, a toad species
Oreolalax jingdongensis, a toad species also known as Jingdong lazy toad or Jingdong toothed toad
Glandular horned toad, a toad species also known as Jingdong spadefoot toad